The 2014 Supercopa de España was a two-legged football match-up played in August 2014 between the champions of 2013–14 La Liga, Atlético Madrid, and the winners of the 2013–14 Copa del Rey, Real Madrid. The first leg ended 1–1. Atlético won the trophy after beating Real Madrid 1–0 in the second leg. This was the first time that the Supercopa de España was a Madrid derby, and also the first time since 2008 that the competition did not feature Barcelona.

Match details

First leg
The opening goal came in the 81st minute when Dani Carvajal crossed from the right for Karim Benzema, whose shot was blocked with the ball falling to substitute James Rodríguez, who found the back of the net with his right foot from seven yards out, his first goal for Real Madrid. Atletico equalized with two minutes to play when Raúl García poked home from two yards with the heel of his right foot after a corner from Koke on the left, which was missed by the Real Madrid defence.

Second leg
Mario Mandžukić scored the only goal of the game after two minutes, converting with a low shot from just inside the penalty area.

Atlético Madrid coach Diego Simeone was sent off after 26 minutes when he patted the referee's assistant on the back of the head.

See also
2014–15 Atlético Madrid season
2014–15 Real Madrid CF season
Madrid derby

References

2014–15 in Spanish football cups
Real Madrid CF matches
Atlético Madrid matches
2014
Madrid Derby matches